Sarwat Ateeq is a Pakistani actress. She is known for her roles in dramas Darwaza, Dukhon Ki Chadar, Mirza & Sons, Samundar, Sach Jhoot, Kaanch Ka Pul, Aankh Macholly and Guest House.

Early life
Sarwat was born in 1949 on May 22 in Lahore, Pakistan. She completed her MA in journalism from Punjab University.

Career
Sarwat had passion for singing although she never learned music from anybody but she would sing songs in School ceremonies and she also did school stage dramas. In 1965 she gave audition for Radio Pakistan and passed the audition. Sarwat participated in children's program and she waorked as child artist. After sometime she got interested in acting and she visited PTV for audition and she was immediately selected by the judges.

She also acted on stages plays and she also did radio. Sarwat received basic training in art from radio but since she was working in dramas and couldn't work on Radio so she left Radio. She started her career on NTV from Lahore Center and she played a major role in director Fazal Kamal's comedy show Sach Jhoot, the drama was a success and then she appeared in many more dramas.

Sarwat also worked in drama Dukhan Ki Chadar on PTV the drama was directed Yawar Hayat and Qasim Jalali which was written by Amjad Islam Amjad. Sarwat's performance was praised by viewers. She also starred in classic drama Darwaza with Asif Raza Mir, Roohi Bano and Durdana Butt the drama was very popular which was written by Munnu Bhai.

In the 1990s she worked in many dramas and her drama Guest House was popular which directed by [[Khalid Hafeez
]] in which she did the role of Raheela Shameem.

Personal life
Sarwat is married to Ateeq Ullah Sheikh and has two children. Sarwat's husband was a program producer in radio.

Filmography

Television

Telefilm

Awards and nominations

References

External links
 PTV's old faces - Sarwat Ateeq

1949 births
Living people
20th-century Pakistani actresses
Punjabi-language singers
PTV Award winners
Pakistani television actresses
21st-century Pakistani actresses
Pakistani film actresses
Radio personalities from Lahore
20th-century Pakistani women singers
Urdu-language singers
Pakistani radio personalities
21st-century Pakistani women singers
Pakistani women singers
Pakistani stage actresses
Singers from Lahore